Ma! He's Making Eyes at Me is a 1940 American comedy film directed by Harold D. Schuster and written by Charles Grayson and Edmund Hartmann. The film stars Tom Brown, Constance Moore, Richard Carle, Anne Nagel, Jerome Cowan, Elisabeth Risdon and Fritz Feld. The film was released on March 15, 1940, by Universal Pictures.

Plot

Cast        
Tom Brown as Tommy Shaw
Constance Moore as Connie Curtiss
Richard Carle as C. J. Woodbury
Anne Nagel as Miss Lansdale
Jerome Cowan as Ted Carter
Elisabeth Risdon as Minerva
Fritz Feld as Forsythe
Larry Williams as Joe Porter
Frank Mitchell as Frank
Vivien Fay as Vivien
Marie Greene as Marie

References

External links
 

1940 films
1940s English-language films
American comedy films
1940 comedy films
Universal Pictures films
Films directed by Harold D. Schuster
American black-and-white films
1940s American films
English-language comedy films